, also spelled Onda, is a type of Japanese pottery produced in and around the village of Onta in Ōita Prefecture, Japan.

History 
The production dates back to the early 18th century CE. Onta ware is closely associated with Mingei folk art.

Onta ware was inscribed by the national government in 1995 as an Intangible Cultural Property. The area has also been inscribed as one of the protected 100 Soundscapes of Japan.

Production 

The earth for the pottery is found in the mountains around Onta. It normally comes in the form of rocks and needs to be ground to a powder. This is done by the usage of traditional water scoops or mills called kara-usu, which rely purely on the flow of the river. The wooden mills grind the earth into a powder, which is then washed and filtered multiple times to purify the material. It is then dried, sometimes over a large oven.

The village is a tightly-knit community, with families of potters going back generations. The work such as the purification of the earth is done by women, while men are responsible for actually creating the wares. Pieces are never signed by an individual but only with the sign of the Onta village. This is to signify that the production of a single vessel was the combined work of the community, not just one person.

Onta ware traditionally consists of utility vessels such as bowls, plates, and tea cups. The style is most often slipware.

See also 
 Mishima ware, which also uses the slip technique
 Koishiwara ware

References

Further reading

External links 

 Ontaya website
 JapanVisitor.com City Guide
 A Tour of the Pottery Towns of Southern Japan Part II - Onta

Japanese pottery
Culture in Ōita Prefecture